Pawn Stars Australia was the Australian adaptation of the American series of the same name. It premiered on 21 July 2015 on A&E. The Australian version is the third international spin-off after Pawn Stars UK and Pawn Stars South Africa.

The series stars brothers Aaron and Ben Senes along with their childhood mate Shanon Folden, who own the well-known chain of pawn stores called Happy Hockers in Sydney.

The series is directed by Martin Baker and produced by Leftfield Pictures, the same company that produces the American original.

The complete first season DVD was scheduled to be released on 5 October 2016.

Development and production
In August 2014, the series was officially commissioned, and Leftfield Pictures (the company behind Pawn Stars U.S.) were officially confirmed as the producers of the local adaptation. It was also stated that the series would air in 2015, rather than in 2014 as previously rumoured. In June 2015 it was announced the series would officially star brothers Aaron and Ben Senes and best friend Shanon Folden and would premiere on 21 July 2015.

The Senes brother said they agreed to do the reality series to help the public know about the pawn industry, which they said is misunderstood. "People can see it's a legitimate operation where we do everything by the book and we have a successful business to prove it", Ben Senes said. The brothers have been in the business for 22 years. Selling jewellery and electronics is the "bread-and-butter" of their business but people also bring in highly unusual items. Through the years they have seen everything from monkey testicles, to gold teeth fillings to rare collectibles such as a vintage red telephone box.

Although Happy Hockers operates 5 stores across Sydney, the series is filmed almost entirely at their Bondi Beach store.

Episodes

References

External links 
 
  of the Happy Hockers Pawn Shop
  of Pawn Stars Australia

A&E (Australian TV channel) original programming
2010s Australian reality television series
2015 Australian television series debuts
English-language television shows
Antiques television series
Pawn shops
 
Television shows set in Sydney
Australian television series based on American television series
Television shows filmed in Australia